The Commodore Commanding Submarines (East) is an operational appointment in the Indian Navy. The COMCOS (E) is the commander of the all submarines and allied units of Eastern Naval Command. Based in Visakhapatnam, Andhra Pradesh, the COMCOS is also the Commanding Officer of the submarine base INS Virbahu. Currently, there are two COMCOS in the Indian Navy, COMCOS (East) and COMCOS (West). The COMCOS (E) is a one star officer holding the rank of Commodore. The current COMCOS (E) is Commodore K. Venkatraman, VSM who took over on 20 February 2020.

History
The submarine base INS Virbahu was commissioned on 19 May 1971 as the shore support base for submarines. The Commanding Officer of Virbahu functioned as the Captain of the submarine squadron and the class Authority for all submarines.

In the early 1970s, four Vela-class submarines were acquired. With this, the 9th submarine squadron was formed and was based on the west coast, in Mumbai. They constituted the 11th submarine squadron. Four more Sindhughosh-class submarines were to be commissioned constituting the 12th submarine squadron.

Since multiple submarine squadrons (SS) had been formed - the 8th and 11th SS in Visakhapatnam and 9th, 10th and 12th SS in Mumbai, the need to group them on each coast was felt. In April 1988, the post of Commodore Submarines East (COMSUB (E)) was created. The COMSUB (E) also commanded the submarine base INS Virbahu, apart from the submarine squadrons. In December 1996, the appointment of COMSUB was re-designated Commodore Commanding Submarines (COMCOS).

Organisation
Today, under the COMCOS (E) are INS Virbahu, the 11th submarine squadron and the 14th submarine squadron, the Submarine Maintenance Unit, the NRW and the SSS. The COMCOS (E) is also the commanding officer of INS Virbahu.

List of COMCOS

See also
 Flag Officer Submarines
 Commodore Commanding Submarines (West)

Notes

References

Bibliography

Indian Navy
Indian military appointments
Indian Navy appointments